Xabier 'Xabi' Otermin Jiménez (born 31 August 1977) is a Spanish former footballer who played as a goalkeeper.

Club career
Born in Zarautz, Gipuzkoa, Basque Country, Otermin finished his youth career with Real Sociedad, and made his senior debut with the reserves in the 1997–98 season, in the Segunda División B. In summer 2000, he signed with neighbouring Real Unión also in the third division.

In July 2003, after being deemed surplus to requirements by manager Miguel Sola, Otermin cut ties with the Txuri-beltz and joined Girona FC in the same tier. He eventually returned to Real Unión and played 29 matches during the 2008–09 campaign, which ended in promotion.

On 19 December 2009, aged 32, Otermin appeared in his first game as a professional, starting in a 1–0 away loss against CD Numancia in the Segunda División. He acted mainly as a backup to Javier Jauregui during the season, as his team was eventually relegated.

Otermin made his 400th competitive appearance for Unión on 12 October 2013, when he started in a 2–0 home win over Atlético Madrid B.

References

External links

1977 births
Living people
People from Zarautz
Spanish footballers
Footballers from the Basque Country (autonomous community)
Association football goalkeepers
Segunda División players
Segunda División B players
Tercera División players
Real Sociedad B footballers
Real Unión footballers
Girona FC players